Open Surgery is the third full-length album by Israeli punk rock band Man Alive, released on September 6, 2005. It was the band's breakthrough album, released worldwide by The Militia Group label, and produced by longtime The Get Up Kids producer Ed Rose, recorded at his own studio Black Lodge Recording in Eudora, KS, in June 2004.

Track listing

Personnel
Jamie Hilsden - lead vocals, rhythm guitar
David Shkedi - lead guitar, vocals 
Jon Shkedi - bass, vocals
Matthew R C Smith - drums, percussion

References

2005 albums
Man Alive (band) albums